Events in the year 1951 in Bulgaria.

Incumbents 

 General Secretaries of the Bulgarian Communist Party: Valko Chervenkov
 Chairmen of the Council of Ministers: Valko Chervenkov

Events

Sports 

 1 April – The Plovdiv derby, a derby in Bulgarian football between Botev Plovdiv and Lokomotiv Plovdiv, had its first match.

References 

 
1950s in Bulgaria
Years of the 20th century in Bulgaria
Bulgaria
Bulgaria